Giovanni Mulassano (born 7 July 1985) is an Italian coach a former skeleton racer and bobbsleder who competed at the IBSF World Championships, in 2011 and 2013 at individual senior level in skeleton and in 2016 in four-man bobsleigh.

References

External links
 

1985 births
Living people
Italian male bobsledders
Italian male skeleton racers
Bobsledders of Fiamme Azzurre
Skeleton racers of Fiamme Azzurre
Italian sports coaches